The Oslo Graben or Oslo Rift is a graben formed during a geologic rifting event in Permian time, the last phase of the Variscan orogeny. The main graben forming period began in the late Carboniferous, which culminated with rift formation and volcanism, with associated rhomb porphyry lava flows. This activity was followed by uplifting, and ended with intrusions about 65 million years after the onset of the formation. It is located in the area around the Norwegian capital Oslo.

The lava production was high when the rhomb porphyry lavas were deposited. The lavas reflect a period of abundant earthquake-related movements, when tectonic forces tore the crust apart.

In the Vestfold district, one lava flow was deposited on average every 250,000 years, resulting in a 3000-metre thick sequence of mainly volcanic material. In the Oslo area, lavas were deposited on average every 800,000 years. Only a few plant remains have been found between these lavas. The bedrock in this area, roughly from Skien to Oslo and Mjøsa, results in soil rich in nutrients important for plant growth.

Since the Permian, erosion has removed the volcanic peaks and indeed most of the lava layer and laid bare the magma chambers and volcanic pipes deep below, allowing scientist a rare view of what goes on beneath a rift valley. Several of the old magma plumes are now quarried, the rich black larvikite (named from Larvik, a town south of Oslo) being  one.

The Särna alkaline complex in western Sweden, also of Late Carboniferous age, is thought to be related to the Oslo Graben as it is aligned to it.

See also

References

External links
Mantle Plume Beneath The Oslo Graben?
Evolution of the Arctic-North Atlantic And The Western Tethys

Paleozoic rifts and grabens
Carboniferous Norway
Geology of Norway
Permian Norway
Aulacogens
Volcanism of Norway
Carboniferous volcanism
Extinct volcanism
Rift volcanism
Valleys of Oslo